Boga Vas is a small settlement in the Municipality of Ivančna Gorica in central Slovenia. It lies just east of Dob pri Šentvidu in the historical region of Lower Carniola. The municipality is now included in the Central Slovenia Statistical Region.

References

External links

Boga Vas on Geopedia

Populated places in the Municipality of Ivančna Gorica